Rádio – Top 100 (originally Rádio Top 100 Oficiálna) is the Slovak national airplay chart published  by the IFPI Czech Republic on a weekly basis since the cancellation of the Slovak national section (SNS IFPI) on December 31, 2009. 
Besides the Top 100 record chart, also the component Rádio Top 50 is effective, featuring exclusively song releases by Slovak and/or Czech artists. Online versions of the charts are released at ifpicr.cz/hitparadask, featuring Top 100, respectively Top 50 positions.

List of number-one songs
List of number-one songs (Slovakia)

See also
Czech Rádio – Top 100 airplay chart

References

External links 
ifpi.sk 
RADIO TOP100 Oficiálna 

Record charts
Slovak music